Edward Raymond Ames (May 20, 1806 – May 15, 1879) was an American Bishop of the Methodist Episcopal Church, elected in 1852.

Birth and family
Ames was born in Amesville, Athens County, Ohio, one of three Methodist Episcopal Bishops to be born in Athens County.

Education and ministry
At age 20, Ames became a student at Ohio University at Athens. During his student years he united with the M.E. Church (August 1827). In 1828 he opened a high school in Lebanon, Illinois which later became McKendree University. He taught there until 1830, when he became a pastor in the Illinois Annual Conference. He was licensed to preach by the circuit rider (and presiding elder), Peter Cartwright. He was ordained deacon in 1832 and elder in 1834.

Upon the organization of the Indiana Conference in 1832, Ames joined that body, serving the majority of his active pastoral life in the State of Indiana (with the exception of two years spent in St. Louis), until becoming a bishop.

Ames was elected a delegate to the General Conference of the Methodist Episcopal Church held in Baltimore in 1840, and was there elected Corresponding Secretary of the M.E. Missionary Society, with responsibilities for the South and West. When the Church South broke with the Church North over slavery, he remained with the M.E. Church. He received the degree of A.M. in 1844 from the State University of Indiana. The Rev. Ames was subsequently elected Delegate to General Conferences in 1844 and 1852.

Native American work
Ames traveled extensively, especially visiting the Indian Missions of his denomination along the northern lakes and on the western frontier. He aided in establishing mission schools among the various tribes west of Arkansas. In 1848 he officiated as chaplain to a Council of Choctaws, being the first chaplain chosen by an Indian Assembly.

Ames was elected president of Indiana Asbury University in 1848, as well. But he declined the position, preferring to remain in more active ministerial work.

Episcopal ministry
Ames was elected to the episcopacy of the Methodist Episcopal Church by the 1852 General Conference. He thereafter traveled extensively through all the U.S. States and Territories. His first visit to the Pacific coast was 1852–53.

Ames was a firm supporter of the Union during the American Civil War. Though offered positions of influence, he declined them that he might be free for ecclesiastical duties. For example, when the United States government seized the property of the Methodist Episcopal Church, South (in Southern United States), Ames was put in charge of the confiscated property by President Abraham Lincoln and Secretary of War Edwin M. Stanton. Such confiscation resulted in complaints of unconstitutional governmental involvement in religion.

Death and burial
Ames' health was impaired for several years, but he continued his work until a few weeks before his death. He died in Baltimore, Maryland. He is buried in Greenmount Cemetery in that city.

See also
List of bishops of the United Methodist Church

References

Cyclopaedia of Methodism, Matthew Simpson, D.D., LL.D., Ed., (Revised Edition.)  Philadelphia, Louis H. Everts, 1880.
Methodism:  Ohio Area (1812–1962), edited by John M. Versteeg, Litt. D., D.D. (Ohio Area Sesquicentennial Committee, 1962).
Obituary in Harper's Weekly, May 17, 1879

Bishops of the Methodist Episcopal Church
American Methodist Episcopal bishops
People from Athens County, Ohio
Ohio University alumni
1806 births
1879 deaths
Choctaw
American chaplains
People of Ohio in the American Civil War
19th-century Methodist bishops
McKendree University faculty
19th-century American bishops
Presidents of DePauw University
Burials at Green Mount Cemetery
Methodist chaplains